Tarboro Historic District is a national historic district located near Tarboro, Edgecombe County, North Carolina. The district encompasses 364 contributing buildings in central Tarboro.  It includes a variety of industrial, commercial, residential, and institutional buildings dating from the late-18th through early-20th centuries.  Located in the district are the separately listed Tarboro Town Common, The Barracks, Redmond-Shackelford House, Pender Museum, Blount-Bridgers House, Coates-Walston House, Calvary Episcopal Church and Churchyard, and the Cotton Press complex.  Other notable buildings include the Morris-Powell House (c. 1890), Porter House (c. 1900), U. S. Post Office (1914), Pippen House (1870s), Dancy-Battle-Bass Clark House (c. 1825), Holderness House (c. 1890-1900), Howard Memorial Presbyterian Church (1908-1909), W. H. MacNair House (1913), Henry Cherry-George White House, Jones House (1870-1875), Tarboro Primitive Baptist Church (c. 1830), St. James Methodist Church (1916), Carolina Telephone & Telegraph (1912), Clark's Warehouse #1 and #2, Battle-Porter-Powell House (c. 1800), Gaskil1-Hussey House (1882), Cheshire-Nash House (c. 1869), and Norfleet Court (1858).

It was listed on the National Register of Historic Places in 1980.

References

Historic districts on the National Register of Historic Places in North Carolina
Buildings and structures in Edgecombe County, North Carolina
National Register of Historic Places in Edgecombe County, North Carolina